Czesław Kukuczka (23 July 1935 – 29 March 1974) was a Polish man who became the one-hundred and fourteenth known person to die at the Berlin Wall. Kukuczka was assassinated during an attempt to threaten the Polish embassy in East Germany into allowing him to migrate to West Berlin, becoming one of only three non-German escapee victims of the Berlin Wall.

Biography
Czesław Jan Kukuczka was born on 23 July 1935, in Kamienica, in Limanowa County, Poland, and grew up there. As a young boy, the local magazine “Gorczańskie Wieści" mentioned him as "the most active of the hotheads - young, full of ideas, and capable of dedication." At the age of 17, Kukuczka was recruited to participate in the construction of Nowa Huta, a socialist model city on the eastern outskirts of Krakow being built by the Polish People's Republic, but soon returned home disillusioned with his work there. A year later, at 18 years-old, Kukuczka was found guilty of embezzlement and sentenced to two and a half years in prison in Nowy Sącz and Jaworzno, but was released after one year on parole. Shortly after his release Kukuczka was married and would father three children, and subsequently worked again in construction before working as a firefighter for the fire department in Jaworzno. On Sunday, 3 March 1974, Kukuczka disappeared without a trace and was not seen again until appearing on 29 March 1974, in East Berlin, East Germany.

Death
On Friday, 29 March 1974, at 12:30 PM, Kukuczka arrived at the Polish Embassy in East Berlin claiming to have an important message, and was admitted to the embassy without further control. He would be hosted by Colonel Maksymilian Karnowski, a member of the East Berlin operational group of the Polish Ministry of the Interior (MSW), and an employee named Olszewski. Kukuczka demanded that he be allowed to cross into West Berlin at 3:00 PM, via the border crossing and international train station at Friedrichstraße, and threatens to detonate a bomb that he was carrying with him, with the detonating cord connected to his left hand. Kukuczka also claimed that if his demands were not met, a supposed accomplice would bomb the Polish Information and Cultural Center on Karl-Liebknecht-Straße, and the events would be reported about in the western world because of another accomplice he claimed to have in West Berlin. Further in his conversation, Kukuczka indicated wishing to immigrate to the United States where he had aunts, and according to documents found on his person their address was in the city of Hollywood, Florida. Kukuczka was counting on Polish embassy personnel to create the necessary travel documents so he could leave East Berlin, which they did provide him with.

Kukuczka departed the Polish Embassy at 2:40 PM with the necessary documents, and was transported to Bahnhof Friedrichstraße by a car belonging to the Stasi, the East German secret police. He disembarked at the train station, used the rest room, then attempted to make his way through the border security. West German students vising from Bad Hersfeld would report to the police in West Berlin that they witnessed a shabbily dressed Kukuczka pass them unsuspectingly, who was then shot in the back by a civilian wearing a dark coat and tinted sunglasses just two meters from his victim, and was seriously injured but still alive. Strangely, Kukuczka was not transported to the Krankenhaus der Volkspolizei (People's Police Hospital), the nearest hospital where most victims of the Berlin Wall were taken, but instead to the hospital within the Stasi Prison in Hohenschönhausen, 10 kilometers away. By 6:30 PM, Kukuczka was dead from numerous internal injuries caused by the gunshot wounds.

Kukuczka's widow in Poland, Emilia, was presented with an urn containing his remains on 24 May 1974, along with a package containing personal effects from her deceased husband, and a death certificate, all presented by the district prosecutor. The next day, the mayor of Kamienica reported that a church burial had taken place with only Kukuczka's close family in attendance, and the full details regarding his death, such as the fake bomb and the visit to the embassy, were not made known to the family or local residents until after the Berlin Wall fell.

Aftermath
Kukuczka is notable as one of only three known escapee deaths at the Berlin Wall to be neither German or an East German resident, along with Franciszek Piesik, also Polish, and Vladimir Odinzov, a Soviet soldier.

See also 
 List of deaths at the Berlin Wall
 Berlin Crisis of 1961

References

1935 births
1974 deaths
Deaths at the Berlin Wall
People from Limanowa County
Deaths by firearm in East Germany
Polish people murdered abroad
People convicted of embezzlement
Polish defectors